1997–98 Bosnia and Herzegovina Football Cup was the fourth season of the Bosnia and Herzegovina's annual football cup. The Cup was won by Sarajevo who defeated Orašje in the super final.

Overview 
An agreement was signed between the Football Federation of Bosnia and Herzegovina and the Football Federation of Herzeg-Bosnia to make the final between the winners of the respective cups.

Bosniak Cup

Round of 16 
The matches were played on 28 February and 1 March 1998.

|}

Quarterfinals
The first legs were played on 11 March and the second legs were played on 25 March 1998.

|}

Semifinals
The first legs were played on 8 April and the second legs were played on 22 April 1998.

|}

Final

Herzeg-Bosnia Cup

Final

Super final 

|}

See also
 1997–98 First League of Bosnia and Herzegovina

References

External links
Statistics on RSSSF
SportSport.ba forum

Bosnia and Herzegovina Football Cup seasons
Cup
Bosnia